Glenalmond College is a co-educational independent boarding school in Perth and Kinross, Scotland, for children aged between 12 and 18 years. The college opened in 1847 as Trinity College, Glenalmond and was renamed in 1983. Originally a boys' school, Glenalmond became co-educational in the 1990s.

History
Trinity College Glenalmond was founded as a private school by the future Prime Minister, William Gladstone and James Hope-Scott. The land for the school was given by George Patton, Lord Glenalmond who for the rest of his life, in company with his wife Margaret, took a keen interest in its development and success.  It was established to provide teaching for young men destined for the ministry of the Scottish Episcopal Church and where young men could be brought up in the faith of that Church. It was originally known as The Scottish Episcopal College of the Holy and Undivided Trinity of Glenalmond. The school opened its doors on 4 May 1847 to fourteen boys (though one boy, Lord Kerr, later Marquess of Lothian and Secretary for Scotland, arrived a day early). The first Warden (headmaster) was Charles Wordsworth.

The Edinburgh architect John Henderson worked on the project in 1841-51; later the firm were to be re-employed with his son George Henderson in charge on rebuilding work after a fire in 1893. In 1955 Basil Spence was engaged to alter the chapel.

In 1983 the school's name was changed to Glenalmond College. Until 1990 Glenalmond was an all-boys school. Girls were initially admitted into the sixth form only, and the school became fully co-educational in 1995.

In 2007 the school received media attention after pupils reportedly created a spoof video that featured them "hunting" "chavs" (a derogatory term in use in the UK) on horseback and with rifles. The school condemned the video.  The school was the subject of a documentary broadcast on BBC 2 in Autumn 2008. Pride and Privilege chronicled a year in the life of Glenalmond and followed a number of pupils and teachers.

Boarding houses
There are seven boarding houses: Goodacre's, Home, Lothian, Matheson's, Patchell's, Reid's and Skrine's.

Notable alumni 

Robbie Coltrane – actor
Andrew Dunlop, Baron Dunlop – Conservative peer
Johnie Everett – cricketer
Christopher Geidt – Queen's private secretary
Georg Friedrich, Prince of Prussia, current head of the House of Hohenzollern
 Andrew Gordon – historian
 Ronald Gordon – cricketer and soldier 
Dougie Hall – rugby player 
David Leslie – rugby player
Alastair Mackenzie — actor
Richard Simpson – Labour Member of the Scottish Parliament and former Justice Minister
Brian Stewart — diplomat and spy
Andrew Macdonald — Film Producer
Kevin Macdonald — Film Director

References

Further reading
The Glenalmond Register 1950–1985 and Supplement 1900–1949, published by Hunter & Foulis Ltd. 1986
Alumni Montium, Sixty Years of Glenalmond and its People, by David Willington, published by Elliott & Thompson, 2008

External links
School Website
Profile on the Good Schools Guide
Profile on the ISC website
Glenalmond College's page on Scottish Schools Online
Pride and Privilege documentary director's film page
Architect and College origins

Category A listed buildings in Perth and Kinross
Listed schools in Scotland
Educational institutions established in 1847
Member schools of the Headmasters' and Headmistresses' Conference
Private schools in Perth and Kinross
Secondary schools in Perth and Kinross
Boarding schools in Perth and Kinross
1847 establishments in Scotland